This is a list of Italian television related events from 1951.

Events 

 September - The first television sets made in Italy are officially presented. The Italian TV is still in an experimental phase and someone also proposes to delay its official starting until the color broadcasting will be available.
 9 December. The press announces the establishment of a financial company (Gruppo Cisalpino) chaired by Cesare Merzagora and aimed to set up the first Italian private television channel, financed by advertising. The new  channel would be based in Milan and start broadcasting in April 1952. The project is stopped by the Minister of Mail and Communications Giuseppe Spataro, but it induces RAI to establish a TV station in Milan, beside the one already existing in Turin.

See also 
List of Italian film of 1951

References